Jin O-hyeon (born 23 June 1936) is a South Korean weightlifter. He competed in the men's lightweight event at the 1960 Summer Olympics.

References

1936 births
Living people
South Korean male weightlifters
Olympic weightlifters of South Korea
Weightlifters at the 1960 Summer Olympics
Sportspeople from Seoul
Weightlifters at the 1958 Asian Games
Asian Games competitors for South Korea
20th-century South Korean people